William Hindman (April 1, 1743January 19, 1822) was an American lawyer and statesman from Talbot County, Maryland. He represented Maryland in  the Continental Congress, and in the federal Congress as both a Representative from the second and seventh districts, and as a U.S. Senator.

William was born in Dorchester County in the Province of Maryland, the second son of Jacob Hindman (1713–1766) and Mary Trippe Hindman (died 1782). Jacob was a plantation owner from Talbot county who served as sheriff of Talbot County from 1745 to 1748, and as a member of the colonial Assembly. William studied law at the Inns of Court in London, returning to Maryland in 1765. He was admitted to the bar, and practiced law in Talbot County.

From 1775 and 1777, Hindman served in Maryland’s revolutionary government, as the state’s Treasurer for the Eastern Shore. He resigned this post when he was elected to the state Senate in 1777. He was re-elected several times, and served until 1784. Maryland sent him as a delegate to the Continental Congress in 1785 and 1786.

Hindman returned to Maryland and served on the governor’s executive council from 1789 to 1792. In 1792 voters returned him to the state Senate, but later that year he was elected to the United States House of Representatives after the resignation of Joshua Seney. He served in the Congress from 1793 to 1799, when he returned to his plantation, although he served in the state’s House of Representatives in 1799 and 1800.

In 1800 Maryland's U.S. Senator James Lloyd resigned, and Hindman was named to finish his term. He served in the United States Senate from December 1800 until November 1801. In the Senate, he was aligned with the Federalists. He declined to run for re-election.

Hindman died in Baltimore, Maryland, and is buried in St. Paul’s Burial Ground there.

See also
 Annapolis Convention (1774–1776)

External links

1743 births
1822 deaths
Continental Congressmen from Maryland
Members of the Maryland House of Delegates
Maryland state senators
United States senators from Maryland
State treasurers of Maryland
People from Dorchester County, Maryland
Federalist Party United States senators
Federalist Party members of the United States House of Representatives from Maryland
18th-century American politicians